Navrongo Central is one of the constituencies represented in the Parliament of Ghana. It elects one Member of Parliament (MP) by the first past the post system of election. Navrongo Central is located in the Kassena/Nankana district of the Upper East Region of Ghana.

Boundaries
The seat is located entirely within the Kassena/Nankana district of the Upper East Region of Ghana.

Members of Parliament

Elections

 
 
 
 
 
 

 
 
 
 
 
 
 

 
 
 
 
 
 
 
 
 
 

Joseph Kofi Adda (NPP) won the by-election held on 25 March 2003 by a majority of 7271, following the death of John Setuni Achuliwor (NPP)  who died on 29 January 2003 after a road traffic accident on 25 January 2003.

See also
List of Ghana Parliament constituencies

References 

Parliamentary constituencies in the Upper East Region